Green, Green Grass of Home is the fifth album released in 1967 by Tom Jones. It is his fourth studio album with Decca Records, produced by Peter Sullivan.

London Records (Parrot label) (USA, Canada) released an abridged version of this album as Funny Familiar Forgotten Feelings (Parrot 71011), whilst that label's album titled Green, Green Grass of Home was largely made up of tracks from From the Heart.

Reception
Stephen Thomas Erlewine of AllMusic notes with this album Jones "began to abandon his teenage pop audience to concentrate on a more mature, middle of the road group of listeners" but says the album is "inconsistent".

Track listing
Side one
 "Riders in the Sky" (Stan Jones)
 "He'll Have to Go" (Audrey & Joe Allison)
 "Funny Familiar Forgotten Feelings" (Mickey Newbury)
 "Sixteen Tons" (Merle Travis)
 "Two Brothers" (Irving Gordon)
 "My Mother's Eyes" (Abel Baer, L. Wolfe Gilbert)
 "Green, Green Grass of Home" (Curly Putman)

Side 2
 "Ring of Fire" (June Carter Cash, Merle Kilgore)
 "A Field of Yellow Daisies" (Charlie Rich)
 "(I Wish I Could) Say No to You" (Mickey Newbury)
 "All I Get From You Are Heartaches" (Al Frisch, Al J. Neiburg)
 "Mohair Sam" (Dallas Frazier)
 "Cool Water" (Bob Nolan)
 "Detroit City" (Danny Dill, Mel Tillis)

References

Tom Jones (singer) albums
Decca Records albums
Albums produced by Peter Sullivan (record producer)